Haridaspur may refer to:

 Haridaspur, Bangladesh
 Haridaspur, Orissa, India
 Haridaspur, Uttar Pradesh, India
 Haridaspur, North 24 Parganas, West Bengal, India
 Haridaspur, West Bengal, India